The South Range Community Building is a community center located on Trimountain Avenue in South Range, Michigan.  It was listed on the National Register of Historic Places in 1981.

History
During the depths of the Great Depression, the unemployment rate in the southern Keweenaw Peninsula was over 75%.  The South Range Community Building was built in 1933-35 and funded by the Civil Works Administration (CWA) and the Federal Emergency Relief Administration as a way to employ the miners and craftsmen of the area.  The building was intended to function as both a social and governmental hub for the community of South Range, and it continues to serve this purpose today.

Description
The South Range Community Building is a one-story rectangular brick building with a facade of sandstone trimmed with brick.  It sits on a mine rock foundation, and is surmounted by a hipped roof with a three front gables flanked with side gables.  Three entrances are centered below the three front gables.

Inside, the building contains village offices and a multi-use auditorium.  The center entrance on the first floor has been converted into a fire station.

References

Event venues on the National Register of Historic Places in Michigan
Buildings and structures completed in 1935
National Register of Historic Places in Houghton County, Michigan
Community centers in Michigan
1935 establishments in Michigan